Origanum rotundifolium, the round-leaved oregano, is a species of flowering plant in the family Lamiaceae, native to Turkey, Armenia and Georgia.

The specific epithet rotundifolium means "round-leaved".

This plant is used as a culinary herb, as an ornamental plant in herb gardens and as groundcover in sunny, well-drained situations. It prefers alkaline soil, and dislikes winter wetness. It has gained the Royal Horticultural Society's Award of Garden Merit.

References

Flora of Western Asia
Plants described in 1859
rotundifolium
Garden plants
Taxa named by Pierre Edmond Boissier